Johnny Yen may refer to:

Yen Hsing-su (born 1976), Taiwanese basketball player, singer, actor
"Johnny Yen", a song from Stutter (album) by James

See also
John Yen, Taiwanese-American researcher of artificial intelligence